Mário Rui Correia Tomás (born 26 April 1983), known as Marinho, is a Portuguese former professional footballer who played as a winger.

He spent most of his career with Naval and Académica, totalling 209 Primeira Liga games and 23 goals between them and scoring the only goal as the latter won the Taça de Portugal in 2012. He added 103 appearances and 11 goals in LigaPro, for Académica and Fátima.

Club career
After unsuccessfully emerging through Sporting CP's youth system, Lisbon-born Marinho went on to play in the lower leagues until 2006, with União Sport Clube, U.D. Vilafranquense and C.D. Olivais e Moscavide. In 2006 he signed with C.D. Fátima, scoring ten goals in 29 matches in his first season to help the club to promote to the Segunda Liga. Additionally, in the following campaign's Taça da Liga, he helped to a 2–1 shock win at former employers Sporting (albeit in an eventual 4–4 aggregate loss).

Courtesy of his solid performances, Marinho moved in January 2008 to the Primeira Liga with Associação Naval 1º de Maio, being cast into the starting XI in his first years but losing that status subsequently. On 10 April 2011, he netted his second goal of the season in a 2–1 home victory over S.L. Benfica, but the Figueira da Foz team eventually returned to the second tier after a six-year stay.

In late June 2011, Marinho signed a three-year contract with Académica de Coimbra in the same league, arriving on a free transfer. On 20 May of the following year, he scored against former club Sporting in the third minute of the final of the Taça de Portugal, the game's only as the Students won the tournament for the second time, the first in 73 years.

Marinho remained with Académica, agreeing to a new three-year deal in May 2014. Now captain, he extended it by a further year following their relegation in July 2016; he and João Real, another 2012 veteran, announced their retirement in July 2019 as new manager César Peixoto would not offer them new contracts.

Career statistics

Club

Honours
Olivais e Moscavide
Segunda Divisão: 2005–06

Fátima
Segunda Divisão: 2006–07

Académica
Taça de Portugal: 2011–12
Supertaça Cândido de Oliveira runner-up: 2012

Individual
Académica Player of the Year: 2012–13
SJPF Segunda Liga Player of the Month: September 2007

References

External links

1983 births
Living people
Portuguese footballers
Footballers from Lisbon
Association football wingers
Primeira Liga players
Liga Portugal 2 players
Segunda Divisão players
Sporting CP B players
U.D. Vilafranquense players
C.D. Olivais e Moscavide players
C.D. Fátima players
Associação Naval 1º de Maio players
Associação Académica de Coimbra – O.A.F. players